The coat of arms of Malta is the national coat of arms of the country of Malta.

The present coat of arms is described by the Emblem and Public Seal of Malta Act of 1988 as a shield showing an heraldic representation of the national flag of Malta; above the shield a mural crown in gold with a sally port and five turrets representing the fortifications of Malta and denoting a city-state; and around the shield a wreath of two branches: the dexter of olive, the sinister of palm, symbols of peace and traditionally associated with Malta, all in their proper colours, tied at base with a white ribbon, backed red and upon which are written the words  (“Republic of Malta” in Maltese) in capital letters in black.

The national coat of arms also appears on the Presidential Standard of Malta.

The various coats of arms appear on passports, excise stamps, official documents and various other uses. Many Maltese coins feature a coat of arms, most notably the second series of the Maltese lira, some Maltese euro coins, and many gold or silver commemorative coins (either denominated in the Maltese lira or in Euro). Coats of arms were featured various times on Maltese postage stamps as well.

Coats of arms between 1800 and 1964
Malta was a British protectorate from 1800 to 1813 and a colony from 1813 to 1964. The coat of arms used in Malta was the arms of Great Britain:

However, Malta had three colonial badges between 1875 and 1964. The first (1875 – ) showed a white Maltese cross on a white and red panel, the second ( – 1943) showed a white and red shield (like the arms of Mdina), and the third (1943–1964) was like the 1898 arms, but with a George Cross on a blue canton on the white half. All three badges were featured on the Maltese state ensigns and the Governor's flag:

Coat of arms between 1964 and 1975

This coat of arms was adopted upon independence on 21 September 1964. It depicts two dolphins which support a depiction of the Maltese flag, one with palm branch and the other with an olive twig representing victory and peace respectively. Above is a mural crown shaped like a fort with five octagonal turrets surmounts a helmet, with red and white ribbons. Below are blue waves representing the surrounding Mediterranean Sea, the Maltese eight-pointed Cross representing the connection with the Order of St. John as well as courage and determination. The ribbon under the shield has the motto  (by Valour and Firmness). Nowadays, this motto is used by the National Order of Merit.

A version with a statant guardant lion on the St Edward's Crown instead of the mural crown was also used, and this served as the coat of arms of the Governor-General of Malta.

Emblem between 1975 and 1988

This emblem was adopted on the 11 July 1975, seven months after Malta became a republic. It showed a coastal scene with the rising sun, a traditional Maltese boat, a shovel and a pitchfork, and an Opuntia. All of these symbols are somewhat connected to Malta. Underneath the image the then-new name of the state  (Republic of Malta) was written.

The Maltese Prime Minister, Dom Mintoff, had wanted to change the 1964 coat of arms since he mistook the mural crown as representing royalty and therefore had no place on republican Malta's coat of arms. Mintoff chose a class of art students taught by Esprit Barthet to create a design to be used on the covers of passports, and a design by Edward Abela was chosen. A final design was agreed upon and the new passports  were printed and the design was officially adopted as the emblem of Malta.

The emblem was controversial since it was not heraldic, and it was replaced by the current coat of arms soon after the Nationalists won the 1987 election. It was proposed that the 1964 coat of arms be readopted, but eventually a simplified version of it was chosen. The new coat of arms was designed by Adrian Strickland, who prepared preliminary sketches, and Robert Calì, who finished the design.

See also 

 Flag of Malta
 History of Malta
 Culture of Malta
 Politics of Malta
 Maltese heraldry

References

External links

Cap. 253 - Emblem and Public Seal of Malta Act

Malta
National symbols of Malta
Malta
Malta
Malta
Saint George and the Dragon